Anna Berndtson (born 1972 in Malmö, Sweden) is a performance artist.

Biography
Anna Berndtson attended Dartington College of Arts in England from 1996 to 1999, and obtained a degree of Bachelor of Arts in Theater. She further studied performance under Professor Marina Abramović at the Hochschule für Bildende Künste in Braunschweig from 2001 to 2005,  and obtained a Diploma (equal to a Master of Fine Arts) in Visual Arts. Anna Berndtson has taught Performance Art, amongst others at Fachhochschule Ottersberg and in the Sverigefinska folkhögskolan, Haparanda.

Career
Berndtson began her artistic career in the late 1990s. She incorporates her own body into her art, for example in her performance piece "Churned", where she immersed herself in a tub of cream, which she over several hours churns into butter. Berndtson works mainly with Long Duration Live Performance but has since the mid 2000s also started to produce photography and video work.

2003 Anna Berndtson co-funded the Swedish/German performance duo TBL (TallBlondLadies), together with her collaborative partner Irina Runge. The duo works with gender and female clichés.

Exhibitions and awards
Anna Berndtson has performed and exhibited work, amongst others, at; Fondation Beyeler, Riehen/Basel, Bergmancenter, Fårö, Liljevalchs, Stockholm, Haus der Kulturen der Welt, Berlin, The LAB Gallery, Dublin, Artists Space, New York City, Kulturhuset, Stockholm, Hebbel am Ufer, Berlin, MoMA PS1 i New York City, Van Gogh Museum, Amsterdam and VV2 at the Venice Biennale.

She has received residence grants from renowned institutions such as Bergman Estate on Fårö in Sweden (2013), Nordic Artists' Centre Dalsåsen, Norway (2012), Fire Station Artists' Studios and Arts & Disability Ireland Studio Award, Dublin (2010) and Künstlerhäuser Worpswede (2006) as well as working grants from amongst others Konstnärsmämden in Sweden (2016 – 2017, 2010 – 2011, 2007) and Aase & Richard Björklunds fond, Malmö (2014 and 2006).

She is a member of Abramovic Foundation founded by Marina Abramović in 2008.

Education
1994 – 1996, BTEC in Performing Art at the City of Bath College, Bath, UK and in 1996, she was awarded as the best student of the year.
1996 – 1999, BA (Honours) Degree in Theater at Dartington College of Arts, Dartington, UK
1998 – 1999, acting at Hochschule der Künste, Berlin, Germany as well as scenography at Kunsthochschule für Gestaltung, Weissensee, Berlin, Germany 
2001 – 2005, Performance, Diplom in Fine Arts by Professor Marina Abramović at the Hochschule für Bildende Künste i Braunschweig, Germany.

References

Featured Long Durational Work at Marina Abramovic Institute (MAI)
Shannon Cochrane for Rapid Pulse International Performance Festival
ArtWiki – 7th Berlin Biennale for Contemporary Art
Rhizome – at the New Museum 
FADO 
Video – When Time Becomes Form, Artists Space, New York 
INTO ME / OUT OF ME, KW Berlin 
INTO ME / OUT OF ME, MoMA PS1, New York 
Artfacts.Net
aboutperformance.de (German)

External links
annaberndtson.com
tallblondladies.com

Swedish performance artists
Living people
1972 births